Gliese 445 (Gl 445 or AC +79 3888) is an M-type main sequence star in the northern part of the constellation Camelopardalis.

Location

It is currently 17.1 light-years from Earth and has an apparent magnitude of 10.8.  It is visible from north of the Tropic of Cancer all night long, but not to the naked eye.  Because the star is a red dwarf with a mass only a quarter to a third of that of the Sun, scientists question the ability of this system to support life. Gliese 445 is also a known X-ray source.

The Voyager 1 probe and Gliese 445 will pass one another within 1.6 light-years in about 40,000 years. By that time Gliese 445 will be in a part of the sky different from its present location. The probe will no longer be operational.

Solar encounter 
While the Voyager probe moves through space towards a 1.6-light-year minimum distance from Gliese 445, the star is rapidly approaching the Sun. At the time the probe passes Gliese 445, the star will be about 1.059 parsecs (3.45 light-years) from the Sun, but with less than half the brightness necessary to be seen with the naked eye. At that time, Gliese 445 will be approximately tied with Ross 248 for being the closest star to the Sun (see List of nearest stars#Future and past).

See also
 Lists of stars

References

External links 
Wikisky image of TYC 4553-192-1 (Gliese 445)

Camelopardalis (constellation)
M-type main-sequence stars
057544
0445
Emission-line stars
TIC objects